Malawsky is a surname. Notable people with the surname include:

Curt Malawsky (born 1970), Canadian lacrosse player and coach
Derek Malawsky (born 1973), Canadian lacrosse player